Blacknorth is an animation and visual effects (VFX) studio based in Belfast, Northern Ireland. It was founded in 2009 by Kris Kelly and Evelyn McGrath, with the latter leaving in 2013. 

The studio has been the recipient of numerous awards including: BAFTA, International Emmy, RTS, Don Quixote Prize, Darklight Award, amongst others.

The studio was commissioned to create a number of projects for Children’s BBC and Comic Relief, which led to international recognition with the short My Autism and Me (BBC, 2011)  which won an RTS Award in 2012 and an International Emmy in 2013. Their next short, Living with Alcohol (BBC, 2013) won a BAFTA for best factual short.

In 2014, Blacknorth were invited to judge the Animation Award at the Fresh Film Fest in Carlsbad, Czech Republic.

Original Work

Short films 
 Here to Fall (2011)
 Following the story of Amy, Here to Fall focuses on a frantic journey which she must take into an unfamiliar, chaotic world as she attempts to reconnect with her father.
 Here To Fall was recognised with a number of awards including the 2012 Darklight Award for Best Animation and the 2012 Don Quixote Prize for Best Animation at the Galway Film Fleadh. Ultimately, it went on to receive a BAFTA nomination for Best Short Animation in 2013. In the same year, it was selected to be shown at a number of festivals, such as: Brooklyn Film Festival, Raindance, Encounters and Foyle Film Festival.

Work-for-Hire

Film 
 Jack & Jill (Happy Madison Productions, 2011) 
 Blacknorth provided visual effects.
 Looper (TriStar Pictures, 2012) 
 Blacknorth provided all visual effects.
 Good Vibrations (The Works, 2013) 
 Blacknorth provided visual effects.
 A Patch of Fog (thefyzz, 2015)
 Blacknorth provided all visual effects.

Short films 
 Yuki (Out Of Orbit, 2010)
 Blacknorth provided all visual effects.
 The Cathedral Quarter (Belfast's Cathedral Quarter, 2014)
 Blacknorth were commissioned to create this short film.
 The Light of My Eyes (Canderblinks, 2014)
 Blacknorth provided the opening title sequence and all visual effects.
 I Am Here (Canderblinks, 2014)
 Blacknorth provided the opening title sequence and all visual effects.

Television 
 Newsround: Living With Alcohol (BBC, 2011)
 Blacknorth were commissioned to produce this animation.
 Newsround: My Autism and Me (BBC, 2012)
 Blacknorth were commissioned to produce this animation.
 Newsround: Behind Closed Doors (BBC, 2013)
 Blacknorth were commissioned to produce this animation.
 Newsround: Hard Times (BBC, 2013)
 Blacknorth were commissioned to produce this animation.
 The Fall (BBC, 2013)
 Blacknorth provided all of the visual effects (series 1).
 The Wipers Times (BBC, 2013)
 Blacknorth provided all of the visual effects.
 Newsround: Cyber-bullying (BBC, 2014)
 Blacknorth were commissioned to produce this animation.

Awards 
 Here To Fall
 BAFTA: Best Short Animation (Nominee, 2013)
 Galway Film Fleadh: Don Quixote Award (Winner, 2013)
 Raindance Film Festival: Best Animation (Nominee, 2013)
 Darklight Film Festival: Best Animation (Winner, 2012)
 My Autism and Me
 International Emmy: Best Kids Factual Programme (Winner, 2013)
 RTS: Craft and Design Award (Winner, 2012)
 Living With Alcohol
 BAFTA: Best Factual Programme (Winner, 2010)

Video games

 Finn in the Forest (2016)
 Finn in the Forest is a platform game where the player will take control of Finn and his sister Nora as they travel on their perilous journey to find Marmalade the cat.
 It will be available on Android and iOS markets as well as being compatible with Oculus Rift.

References

Companies based in Belfast
British animation studios
Video game development companies
2009 establishments in Northern Ireland